Mathews Mor Anthimos (born 3 November 1974) is a Syriac Orthodox bishop, currently Metropolitan of Muvattupuzha Region and Patriarchal Vicar of U.K. & Ireland Dioceses .

Education
Mathews Mor Antheemos completed his Matriculation from Vidyadhiraja Vidya Bhavan Higher Secondary School, Aluva, Kerala. Later did his degree in B.A and M.A in Economics from Mahatma Gandhi University, Kerala, Kottayam and then joined the United Theological College, Bangalore, Karnataka, for a B.D. (Bachelor of Divinity). He received a Certificate in German Language from Ostkirchliches Institut, Regensburg, Germany.
He has a Doctorate in Theology (D Th) from the Paris Lodron University, Salzburg, Austria in Patristic Theology – “Integrity of Creation in the Theology of Ephrem the Syrian. A Patristic Eco-theology” – guided by the Head of the Department of Biblical Studies and Ecclesiastical History Univ. Prof. Dr. Dietmar W. Winkler.

Compositions
 Sathya Viswasasamrakshakan CD/Cassettes 2003, (Released by Mor Athanasius Singers, Aluva)
 The Lord Reigns CD 2004, (Released by Vox Dei, Aluva)
 Voice of Christmas CD 2011, (Released by Vox Dei, Aluva)
 Vishudha Mariyam CD 2017, (Released by Vox Dei, Aluva)

References

Syriac Orthodox Church bishops
Indian Oriental Orthodox Christians
1974 births
Living people
People from Aluva